The 2014 Sunderland City Council Election took place on 22 May 2014 to elect members of Sunderland Metropolitan Borough Council in Tyne and Wear, England, as part of the wider 2014 United Kingdom local elections. A third of the council (25 of 75 seats) were up for election, the Labour Party stayed in overall control of the council.

Election results
The Labour Party remained in control of the council, but had its majority reduced by one. Although Labour gained a seat from the Conservatives in St Chad's, they lost a seat to the Conservatives in St Peter's. Labour Party Mayor, Councillor Robert Heron, lost his Copt Hill seat to Independent candidate Anthony Allen by 70 votes. Labour's one gain against two losses left them with a net loss of one councillor. For the first time ever, UKIP fielded a candidate in almost every ward, which led to them finishing second behind Labour, in terms of the popular vote, with 24%. Although UKIP failed to gain a seat, they came within 119 votes in Hetton and came second in 16 of the 23 wards they contested. This also led to a reduction in Labour's share of the vote in 18 out of the 25 wards. The overall turnout in the election was 33%.

After the election, the composition of the council was as follows:

Ward by ward results

References

2014
2014 English local elections
21st century in Tyne and Wear